The 1997 Tennessee Oilers season was their 38th season overall and 28th in the National Football League. It was the team's first season in Memphis, Tennessee after moving from Houston, and they played at the Liberty Bowl Memorial Stadium.

Led by head coach Jeff Fisher, the Oilers finished the season with 8 wins and 8 losses, and did not qualify for the playoffs. Despite defeating the Oakland Raiders 24–21 in their first game in their new city, they lost the next four games and would not recover.

Offseason

NFL draft

Personnel

Staff

Roster

Preseason

Regular season
  
The Oilers' new stadium would not be ready until 1999, however, and the largest stadium in Nashville at the time, Vanderbilt Stadium on the campus of Vanderbilt University, seated only 41,000.  At first, Bud Adams rejected Vanderbilt Stadium even as a temporary facility and announced that the renamed Tennessee Oilers would play the next two seasons at Liberty Bowl Memorial Stadium in Memphis.  The team would be based in Nashville, commuting to Memphis only for games—in effect, consigning the Oilers to 32 road games for the next two years.  Even though this arrangement was acceptable to the NFL and the Oilers at the time, few people in either Memphis or Nashville were pleased by it.  Memphis had made numerous attempts to get an NFL team (including the Memphis Hound Dogs and the Memphis Grizzlies court case), and many people in the area wanted nothing to do with a team that would be lost in only two years—especially to longtime rival Nashville.  Conversely, Nashvillians showed little inclination to drive over 200 miles (300 km) to see "their" team. As a result, attendance at the Liberty Bowl was disastrous: on at least two occasions, fewer than 18,000 fans came to the stadium to see the Oilers, a number smaller than the attendance figures the team was getting in Houston after they had announced the move, and smaller than the fan bases the USFL's Memphis Showboats and XFL's Memphis Maniax had drawn/would draw to the same stadium. If not for the attendance of fans supporting the Oilers' opponents, attendance would likely have even been smaller than it was for the CFL's Memphis Mad Dogs. Even in weeks when the Oilers drew over 30,000 fans (which only happened twice), many of the attendees were fans of the opposing team, padding the attendance totals.

Schedule

Game summaries

Week 1: vs. Oakland Raiders

Week 2: at Miami Dolphins

Week 4: vs. Baltimore Ravens

Week 5: at Pittsburgh Steelers

Week 6: at Seattle Seahawks

Week 7: vs. Cincinnati Bengals

Week 8: vs. Washington Redskins

Week 9: at Arizona Cardinals

Week 10: vs. Jacksonville Jaguars

Week 11: vs. New York Giants

Week 12: at Jacksonville Jaguars

Week 13: vs. Buffalo Bills

Week 14: at Dallas Cowboys
Thanksgiving Day games

Week 15: at Cincinnati Bengals

Week 16: at Baltimore Ravens

Week 17: vs. Pittsburgh Steelers

Standings

References

External links
 1997 Tennessee Oilers at Pro-Football-Reference.com

Tennessee Oilers
Tennessee Titans seasons
Titans